Arsenio Veloso Climaco (Toledo, June 24, 1870– Cebu City, November 15, 1952), the son of Valeriano (sibling of former governor Juan Climaco) and Gliceria Veloso, was born on June 24, 1870 and grandson of Juan F. Climaco. Arsenio Climaco, who married Juanita Osmeña, was the Governor of Cebu province, Philippines from 1923 until 1930, succeeding Manuel Roa. Mananga bridge in Talisay City was constructed. His stint was marked with the Great Depression, and he devoted his time on repair projects of damaged infrastructure caused by typhoon. He died on November 15, 1952. On September 10, 1968, the Cebu City Council enacted Ordinance No. 635 renaming Orchid Street to Gov. Arsenio Climaco Street in his honor.

References 

1870 births
1952 deaths
Governors of Cebu
Cebuano people
Visayan people
People from Cebu